"Point Seen Money Gone"  is a song by American rapper Snoop Dogg. It was released for digital download on June 27, 2016 as the second single of his fourteenth studio album Coolaid, with the record labels; Doggystyle Records and eOne Music. It was produced by Bongo and features guest vocal from American recording artist Jeremih.

Music video 
On July 5, 2016 Snoop uploaded the music video for "Point Seen Money Gone" on his YouTube and Vevo account. The music video was directed by Benny Bloom and produced by John Lathan. The video takes place in a strip club in Las Vegas.

Track listing 
Download digital
Point Seen Money Gone (featuring Jeremih) — 4:19

Release history

References

2016 singles
2016 songs
Snoop Dogg songs
Jeremih songs
MNRK Music Group singles
Songs written by Snoop Dogg
Songs written by Jeremih